Ya'acov Dorchin (born 12 March 1946), also known as Yaacov Dorchin, is an Israeli sculptor and painter.

Biography
Dorchin was born in Haifa in Mandate Palestine in 1946.  In 1967, he moved to Kibbutz Kfar HaHoresh.

In the 1980s, Dorchin began creating iron sculptures.  He has lectured at the University of Haifa since 1991 and served as the head of the university's Art Department from 1997 to 2001.

As of 2020, Dorchin is the artistic director of the Basis art school, a position he took in 2015.

In 1990 Dorchin exhibited at the Israeli Pavilion in Venice Biennale.

Awards
 In 2004, Dorchin was awarded the EMET Prize, for the arts.
 In 2011, he was awarded the Israel Prize, for the visual arts.

Bibliography
 Tel Aviv Museum of Art, Yaacov Dorchin, Tel Aviv, Tel Aviv Museum of Art, 1995.

See also 
List of Israel Prize recipients

References

External links

  Resume of Ya'acov Dorchin (in Hebrew), Israel Prize website.

Israeli contemporary artists
Jewish sculptors
Israeli male sculptors
Israeli male painters
20th-century Israeli male artists
21st-century Israeli male artists
Modern sculptors
Academic staff of the University of Haifa
Academic staff of Oranim Academic College
Israel Prize in sculpture and painting recipients
Jewish Israeli artists
20th-century Israeli Jews
21st-century Israeli Jews
Living people
1946 births